The Angevin is an extinct breed of light saddle-horse from the former province of Anjou in western France. It was bred principally in the area around Angers in the département of Maine-et-Loire. It stood about 149–157 centimetres at the withers. It was much used as a mount for light cavalry. The Angevin was merged with other French regional breeds of riding horse, including the Anglo-Normand, the Charentais, the Charolais and the Vendéen, to create the Selle Français in 1958.

References 

Horse breeds originating in France
Extinct horse breeds
Horse breeds